Vesta is the Roman goddess of the hearth, home, and family.

The given name may also refer to:

People:
Vesta Hathaway (Marina Oliver, born 1934), British writer
Vesta Kasputė (born 1984), Lithuanian chess player
Vesta M. Roy (1925–2002), American politician
Vesta Tilley (Matilda Alice Powles, 1864–1952), English actress
Vesta Victoria (1873–1951), English actress
Vesta Williams (1957–2011), American singer

Fictional characters:
Vesta, a non-player character from Fer.al
Vesta (Marvel Comics), Marvel Comics character
Sailor Vesta or VesVes, character in Sailor Moon

See also
Vesta (disambiguation)

Feminine given names